Journal of Entrepreneurship and Innovation in Emerging Economies is a peer-reviewed journal that provides a unique platform for the dissemination of a range of critical entrepreneurship, innovation, business and economic development issues pertaining to and of relevance to emerging economies.

It is published twice in a year by SAGE Publications in association with International Entrepreneurship Forum.

This journal is a member of the Committee on Publication Ethics (COPE).

Abstracting and indexing 
 Journal of Entrepreneurship and Innovation in Emerging Economies  is abstracted and indexed in:
 J-Gate

External links
 
 Homepage

References
 http://publicationethics.org/members/

SAGE Publishing academic journals
Biannual journals
Business and management journals
Publications established in 2015
Entrepreneurship organizations